Resistência Lula da Silva is the female pet mongrel of Luiz Inácio Lula da Silva and his wife Rosângela. It was the first animal to climb the entrance ramp of the Planalto Palace during the Brazilian presidential inauguration ceremony. Resistência received the title of Canine Ambassador for Animal Adoption in 2022 during the National Animal Rights Day.

History 
Resistência wandered between the tents of the camp "Lula Livre" in Curitiba where the president was imprisoned. Previously, she used to walk among cars around the Federal Police Superintendence area. Two metalworkers started to care for the dog during the vigil, and she started to live among the demonstrators. After falling ill, she was adopted by Rosângela (Janja), Lula's girlfriend at the time. Lula did not meet Resistência until after his release. The dog inspired the creation of an animal rights sector within the Brazilian Workers' Party.

On January 1, 2023, Resistência took the ramp at the inauguration of President Lula, together with representatives of civil society, since Jair Bolsonaro did not pass the sash to Lula as is the custom.

Gallery

See also 

 Bo (dog)
 United States presidential pets
 Loukanikos
 Negro Matapacos

References 

Individual dogs in politics